The Temple of Juno Sospita ("Savior") was an ancient Roman temple on the Palatine Hill in Rome, possibly dating from as early as 338 BC.

It was probably a term for a small shrine adjoining the Temple of the Magna Mater (recorded by Ovid), parts of which remain in Augustan-era opus reticulatum, although most of the remains belong to a Hadrianic restoration.

A minority interpretation is that 'Temple of Juno Sospita' was another term for the Temple of the Magna Mater's auguraculum.

If still in use by the 4th-and 5th century, it would have been closed during the persecution of pagans in the late Roman Empire.

See also
List of Ancient Roman temples

References

Bibliography
Filippo Coarelli, Guida archeologica di Roma, Verona, Arnoldo Mondadori Editore, 1984

Juno
Temples of Juno
4th-century BC religious buildings and structures